Pithophora is a genus of green algae in the family Pithophoraceae.

This kind of filamentous algae has a coarse texture to it hence often referred to as "horse hair".

References

External links

Cladophorales genera
Pithophoraceae